Heiner's Bakery (est. 1905) is a commercial bakery located in Huntington, West Virginia which distributes baked goods within a range of about 200 miles from that location.

The bakery was privately owned by the Heiner family, and marketed exclusively under the "Heiner's" label until it was acquired by the Earthgrains division of Anheuser-Busch in 1994.  Six months later, A-B spun off its bread business as the stand-alone Earthgrains Corporation.   In 2000, Earthgrains merged with the Sara Lee Corporation.  In 2011, Sara Lee sold its bread business, including the trademark Sara Lee, to the worldwide Grupo Bimbo, which is based in Mexico City.

Today the bakery markets under the "Heiner's", "Earthgrains", "Sara Lee" and "Bimbo" brands.

References

External links

Buildings and structures in Huntington, West Virginia
Bakeries of the United States
Grupo Bimbo brands
Grupo Bimbo subsidiaries